The Tripura Rahasya (Devanagari: त्रिपुरा रहस्य) meaning The Mystery beyond the Three cities, is an ancient literary work in Sanskrit believed to have been narrated by Dattatreya to Parashurama. It is an ancient prime text which is one of the treatises on Advaita school of classical Indian Metaphysics.

Textual History and Structure

Tripurā means "three cities" or "the trinity." Rahasya means "secret" or "mystery." In a sense there is no secret to be revealed. It is only due to lack of wisdom that humans don't experience their true nature. Therefore, mystery would be a more appropriate translation. Thus, Tripura Rahasya means the Mystery beyond the Trinity. The three cities or states of consciousness are waking (Jāgṛat), dreaming (Svapna) and deep sleep (Suṣupti). The underlying consciousness in them all is called Sri Tripura, the Mother Goddess Tripura Sundari.

The Tripura Rahasya expounds the teachings of the supreme spiritual truth. The highest truth was first taught by Lord Shiva to Lord Vishnu. Lord Vishnu incarnated on earth as Sri Dattatreya, Lord of the Avadhutas, who taught this to Parasurama, who later taught it to Haritāyana.

The Tripura Rahasya is a dialogue between Lord Dattatreya and Parasurama. It is also called the Haritāyana Samhitā after its author Haritāyana, son of Harita.

It is said to consist of 12,000 slokas in three sections - the Jñāna Khaṇḍa (Section on Supreme Wisdom), the Mahātamya Khaṇḍa (Section on the Greatness of Sri Devi), and the Caryā Khaṇḍa (Section on Conduct). Of these the first consists of 6,687 slokas; the second of 2,163 slokas; and the third is untraceable.

Historical context
Jamadagni was a Brahmin saint who lived in the forest with his wife Renuka and his sons, of whom Parasurama was the youngest, the most renowned and valiant. The country was then ruled by Haihayas, a certain clan of Kshatriyas. Some of them came into a clash with Parasurama, but fared the worse. They dared not challenge him afterwards. Their rancor, however, remained, and they could not resist their longing for revenge. They seized their opportunity when Parasurama was far away from the hermitage and attacked and killed his saintly father. On the son’s return, the mother narrated the unprovoked murder of the saint; she also desired that her husband’s body should be cremated on the banks of the Ganges and that she might perform Sati by mounting the funeral pyre.

Parasurama vowed that he would clear the earth of the Kshatriya vermin. He placed his father’s corpse on one shoulder and took his living mother on the other and set out for to the Ganges. While passing through a forest an Avadhuta, by name Dattatreya, saw Renuka and stopped the young man who carried her. The Avadhutha addressed Renuka as Shakti incarnate, of unparalleled might (ऐकवीरा) and worshipped her. She blessed him and told him of her life on earth and her resolve to end it. She also advised her son to look to Dattatreya for help when needed. Parasurama went on his way and fulfilled his mother’s desire.

He then challenged every Kshatriya in the land and killed them all. Their blood was collected in a pool in Kurukshetra, and Parasurama offered oblations to his forefathers with it. His dead ancestors appeared and told him to desist from his bloody revenge. Accordingly, he retired into a mountain fastness and lived as a hermit. Hearing on one occasion of the prowess of Rama, his wrath rekindled and he came back to challenge him. Rama was born of Dasaratha who, though a Kshatriya, escaped his doom by a ruse. Rama accepted Parasurama’s challenge and got the better of him.

Dattatreya

There was once a dutiful wife whose husband was, however, a licentious wretch. This couple unwittingly disturbed Rishi Mandavya, who had been placed on a spear by a misguided king. The Rishi, who was in agony but not dying, cursed them, saying that the husband would die at sunrise and the wife be left a widow. Widowhood is most abhorrent to a Hindu lady and considered worse than death. By the force of her intense loyalty to her husband she resisted the curse of the Rishi: The Sun could not rise, and the Gods were rendered impotent.

The Gods in council resolved to approach Anasuya — the ideal of wife-hood — to ask her to prevail on the other lady to relent. Anasuya promised her that she would restore her dead husband to life, and so the matter ended satisfactorily for all.

The three chief Gods then agreed to be born as sons to Anasuya. Brahma was born as the Chandra (Moon); Shiva as Durvasa; and Sri Narayana as Datta. The last is also called “Datta Atreya,” of which the latter word is the patronymic derived from Atri, the husband of Anasuya. Sri Dattatreya is the foremost in the line of divine teachers incarnate on earth.

Parasurama's encounter with Samvarta

After encounter with Rama, Parasurama returned crest-fallen and on his way met an Avadhuta named Samvarta, the brother of Brihaspati who advised him to seek Dattatreya. Later he encountered Sri Dattatreya who instructed him in the Truth with added injunction that it should be communicated to Haritayana who would later seek the truth from him and so led him to salvation. Parasurama thus realized the Self by the guidance of Sri Datta and dwelt on the Malaya Hill in South India.

Later a Brahmin Sumedha, son of Harita (hence the name "Haritayana") sought Parasurama to learn the highest good from him, who in turn imparted to him the knowledge which he had gained from Dattatreya. Parasurama told him also that his Master had predicted the compilation of the knowledge of the Highest Truth by Haritayana for the benefit of mankind.

Translation
Tripura Rahasya was venerated by Ramana Maharshi, he often quoted from it and regretted that it was not available in English. As a consequence Sri Munagala Venkataramaiah (now Swami Ramanananda Saraswathi) took up the work of translation in 1936.This was first published in parts in the Bangalore Mythic Society's Journal (Quarterly) from January 1938 to April 1940 and afterwards collected into book form.

A newer translation by "SAMVID" was published in 2000 by Ramana Maharshi Centre for Learning (Bangalore). The translator has based her/his introduction on the commentary of Srinivasa (Tatparyadipika) and writes that s/he has attempted a faithful and literal translation, even at the possible occasional expense of readability.

Mahatmya Khandam of Tripura Rahasyam has been translated into English by T B Lakshmana Rao (2011) and published by Sri Kailasamanidweepa Trust, Bangalore. This book has Sanskrit text with English translation. 

Sakti Sadhana: Steps to Samadhi is another reputed translation of Tripura Rahasya. This is published by the Himalayan Institute with an introductory essay by Swami Rama. Pandit Rajmani Tigunait translated the Sanskrit original into easy to follow English, while also retaining the spiritual gravity.

Bibliography

References

External links
Tripura Rahasya in PDF format
Tripura Rahasya in Sanskrit PDF format

Hindu texts
Sanskrit texts
Metaphysics of religion
Metaphysics literature
Advaita Vedanta